Sylvain Locas (born February 17, 1958 in Chicoutimi, Quebec) is a former professional ice hockey centre.

Prior to turning professional Locas played four seasons (1974–78) in the QMJHL with the Chicoutimi Saguenéens and Sherbrooke Beavers.  Locas was drafted in the sixth round by the Detroit Red Wings in the 1978 NHL Amateur Draft but never managed to play in the National Hockey League.

Locas played 75 games of professional hockey in the CHL with the Kansas City Red Wings, 36 games in the AHL with the Nova Scotia Voyageurs and Adirondack Red Wings, and 25 games in the IHL with the Kalamazoo Wings and Milwaukee Admirals before retiring from professional hockey in 1980.

Locas returned, after nearly a decade away from the game, to play for Brûleurs de Loups based in Grenoble, France in the Ligue Magnus for two seasons.

Career statistics

External links

1958 births
Adirondack Red Wings players
Brûleurs de Loups players
Canadian ice hockey centres
Chicoutimi Saguenéens (QMJHL) players
Detroit Red Wings draft picks
Sherbrooke Castors players
Sportspeople from Saguenay, Quebec
Kalamazoo Wings (1974–2000) players
Kansas City Red Wings players
Living people
Milwaukee Admirals players
Nova Scotia Voyageurs players
Ice hockey people from Quebec
Canadian expatriate ice hockey players in France